Triosteum aurantiacum, also known as orangefruit horse-gentian, is a perennial species of Triosteum native to North America.

Growth 

Use
Triosteum aurantiacum has been used to treat a variety of medical issues by Native Americans, and can be used as a coffee substitute when roasted.

References 

Caprifoliaceae
Taxa named by Eugene P. Bicknell